Wrentham may refer to:

Places
Wrentham, Alberta, Canada
Wrentham, Suffolk, England
Wrentham, Massachusetts, United States of America

Other
HMS Wrentham (M2779), a Royal Navy minesweeper